Rudolph Blankenburg School is a historic school located in the Mill Creek neighborhood of Philadelphia, Pennsylvania. It is part of the School District of Philadelphia. It is named in honor of Rudolph Blankenburg, who was mayor of Philadelphia between 1911 and 1915. The building was designed by Irwin T. Catharine and built in 1923–1925. It is a three-story, nine bay by five bay, brick building on a raised basement in the Colonial Revival style. It features large stone arch surrounds on the first level, a projecting entrance pavilion, a double stone cornice, and brick parapet topped by stone coping.

The building was added to the National Register of Historic Places in 1988.

References

External links

School buildings on the National Register of Historic Places in Philadelphia
Colonial Revival architecture in Pennsylvania
School buildings completed in 1925
School District of Philadelphia
West Philadelphia
Public K–8 schools in Philadelphia
1925 establishments in Pennsylvania